Online counseling is a form of professional mental health counseling that is generally performed through the internet. Computer aided technologies are used by the trained professional counsellors and individuals seeking counselling services to communicate rather than conventional face-to-face interactions[17] . Online counselling is also referred to as teletherapy, e-therapy, cyber therapy, or web counselling[18]. Services are typically offered via email, real-time chat, and video conferencing.  Some clients use online counseling in conjunction with traditional psychotherapy, or nutritional counseling. An increasing number of clients are using online counseling as a replacement for office visits.

While some form of telepsychology and telepsychiatry has been available for over 35 years, the development of internet video chat systems and the continued increase of the market penetration for the broadband has resulted in the continuing growth of online therapy. Some clients are using videoconferencing, live chat and email services with a mental health professional in place of or in addition to face-to-face meetings.

History 
One of the first demonstrations of the Internet was a simulated psychotherapy session between computers at Stanford and UCLA during the International Conference on Computer Communication in October 1972. Although this was a simulation and not actual counseling, the demonstration created an interest in the potential of online communication for counseling. As access to the internet, bulletin boards, and online services became more available in the 1980s, and online communication became more common, virtual self-help groups naturally developed. These self-help groups may be considered a precursor to online counseling. When the World Wide Web became public in the early 1990s and mental health professionals began to create websites offering mental health information, some began to receive requests for personal help and started to respond to these requests, leading to the advent of online counseling.

Information on sources related to online counseling was first created by Martha Ainsworth. In 1995, Martha Ainsworth began searching for a competent therapist because she had some psychological complaints. Her travel requirements made it difficult for her to consult a face-to-face therapist, and therefore, she needed an effective alternative online therapist. She only found a dozen web pages that offered online treatment for psychological complaints. Afterward, Martha Ainsworth wanted to reach the general public with her experiences and founded a clearinghouse for mental health websites, named Metanoia. By the year 2000, this clearinghouse contained over 250 websites of private practices and more than 700 online clinics where a therapist could be contacted.

According to metanoia.org, the first service to offer online mental healthcare was "Ask Uncle Ezra", created by staff of Cornell University in 1986 for students. By mid-1995 several fee-based online services offering mental health advice had appeared. Between 1994 and 2002, a group of trained volunteer crisis counselors called "Samaritans", began providing suicide prevention services via email. There has been continuous increase in number of online counselling therapists and groups due to increase in web-based services and anonymity associated with virtual sessions. [19]

Advantages and disadvantages of online counseling

Advantages
Online counseling offers several advantages. These include:

 Increased accessibility: Online counseling fills an unmet need for clients located in areas traditionally under-served by traditional counselors. Rural residents, people with disabilities and expatriates, along with under-served minorities, often have an easier time finding a suitable therapist online than in their local communities. It also makes counseling accessible to clients who face difficulties in keeping appointments during normal business hours, while decreasing the number of missed appointments for in-person therapy. Along with accessibility of therapists, online counseling also enables accessibility of information to the clients. In face-to-face counseling, information is stored only with the therapists. In online counseling, the transcripts of communications between the therapist and clients may be available to therapists as well as clients. This allows people seeking therapy to monitor changes in their own conditions.
 Increased comfort and convenience: Online counseling can offer higher comfort and convenience for clients and therapists alike. Therapists or clients may not need to travel for their sessions, which may be less expensive and more comfortable for all involved.  In addition to the convenience, many people also enjoy the perceived confidentiality that comes with online counseling. They tend to feel more comfortable sharing information with their mental health professional and may feel less ashamed and powerless due to the removed environment.
 Less expensive: Although most therapists charge the same fees for teleconsultations as they would for direct counseling, teletherapy can be relatively less expensive as it does not involve travel costs if both parties have internet access from where there are.
 Approachable treatments: Online access to therapy may help remove the stigma around mental health and can help individuals feel more comfortable with discussing mental health issues.

Disadvantages
Some of the disadvantages of online counseling include:

 Anonymity and privacy: Online counseling uses technology-aided devices and internet as the main medium for communication between the therapist and the client. All the personal and sensitive information of patients is stored on internet sites or devices. This increases the risk of data theft. While online counseling can feel more private than face-to-face interactions, there is potential for breaches of privacy in online counseling. For example, non-encrypted electronic Internet communications might be intercepted, and records could be accessed by family members or hackers. In online counseling, there may be a lower risk of discrimination based on race, ethnicity, age or gender, because these factors can be more difficult for the therapist to perceive in an online context. It is important to establish the safety of the site and verification of therapist or client before beginning an online counseling session. 
 Finding the right match for therapeutic needs of clients: Online counseling does not guarantee the right match for the therapeutic needs of the clients.  Emotional and visual contact can be absent during online counseling sessions. This absence may prevent therapists from sensing negative feelings like anger, terseness, or irritation in clients. It can also cause the sessions to be more straight to the point and less emotionally gradual, which can be beneficial or not depending on the client's need.
 Establishing authenticity of therapists or counselors: Counselors and therapists are professional health care providers and hence require licenses to undertake clients for counseling as a part of their mandatory professional requirements. Psychologists and professional health care providers also require licensing in the state or other governmental subdivision where they practice in order to take clients. As the internet allows clients to choose therapists all across the world, establishing legitimacy and authenticity of the therapists or counselors may be difficult.
 Unreliable technology:  Slow internet, power outages are some of the challenges that can arise from using technology for counseling.

Medical uses and effectiveness
Although there is some preliminary support for the possibility that online counseling may help populations that otherwise underutilize traditional in-office counseling, the question of the effectiveness and appropriateness of online counseling has not been resolved.

Mental health 
Research from G.S. Stofle suggests that online counseling would benefit people functioning at a moderately high level. J. Suler suggests that people functioning at a particularly high level, and who are well-educated and are artistically inclined, may benefit the most from using text-based online counseling to as a complement to ongoing psychotherapy.  Severe situations, such as suicidal ideation or a psychotic episode, might be better served by traditional face-to-face methods, although further research may prove otherwise.

Cohen and Kerr conducted a study on the effectiveness of online therapy for treatment of anxiety disorders in students and found that there was no difference in the level of change for the two modes as measured by the State-Trait Anxiety Inventory.

As the main goal of counseling is to alleviate the distress, anxiety or concerns experienced by a client when he or she enters therapy, online counseling has strong efficacy under that definition.  Research has come to show that the effects and benefits that online counseling has to offer is equivalent or comparable to in-person counseling. This suggests that online counseling does have the capacity to allow patients therapeutic effects of counseling without having to go into the office, wait in a waiting room, or even leave the home. Client satisfaction surveys have demonstrated a high level of client satisfaction with online counseling, while the providers sometimes demonstrate lower satisfaction with distance methods.

Nutrition counseling
Nutrition counseling specific to conditions is available by many consultants online using Skype or another face-to-face program. This is especially effective for people with a busy work schedule, and others who can't make it to an office regularly. Online consulting for imbalances in blood lipid levels, blood sugar regulation, and other health conditions make it easier to manage when using nutritional approaches.

Smoking cessation
The effectiveness of real-time video counseling for helping people to stop smoking is unclear. Few studies compare the effects of video and telephone counseling on smoking cessation.

New technological applications in online counseling 
Online counseling has evolved with the newer developments of technology and therapeutic programs. There are now apps and programs being developed to make the complex processes of therapy and planning manageable for the patient through their smartphone. This makes certain resources more readily available to the patient in the form of self-monitoring, self-improvement courses, treatment and care management, and data collection of personal trends and symptoms.

"MyCompass" is a specific self-help program that many online counselors use for their patients. This tool help track factors associated with treatment plans including mood, personally log data, and diary entries. These collections allows the program to examine and present the individual and their practitioner how different factors influence and impact one another.

Online counseling and COVID-19 
Online counseling increased dramatically in 2020 during the COVID-19 pandemic as many countries issued lockdowns to control the spread of the virus.  Consequently, mental health professionals were unable to meet with their clients in person, so continued treatment online. In addition to this transition, the pandemic and associated quarantine caused many people to become anxious and depressed, which resulted in an increased demand for mental health services. Because online counseling became so prominent during this time, the overall use of online counseling increased even as social distancing eased.

See also
 Cyberpsychology
 Social media therapy
 Telephone counseling

References 

Counseling
Internet culture
Treatment of mental disorders
Telemedicine